Melaleuca stipitata is a plant in the myrtle family, Myrtaceae and is endemic to a small area in the Northern Territory of Australia. It is a rare species, only discovered in 1991 and is unusual in that it is the only known example of Melaleuca having stalked flowers. Its leaves have an essential oil with a pleasant, lemon scent possibly suitable for commercial production.

Description

The flowers are white or cream-coloured and are arranged in spikes on the ends of branches which sometimes continue to grow after flowering. The floral cup (the hypanthium) has a short stalk - an unusual feature for a melaleuca.

Taxonomy and naming
Melaleuca stipitata was first formally described in 1997 by Lyndley Craven and Bryan Barlow in Novon from a specimen collected below the Bukbukluk Lookout along the Kakadu Highway. The specific epithet (stipitata) is a New Latin word meaning "borne on a stalk" referring to the unusual stalked hypanthium of the flowers.

Distribution and habitat
This melaleuca occurs in the Bukbukluk area in the Kakadu National Park. It grows in woodland on shaly slopes.

Use as a source of essential oils
The oil extracted from the leaves of Melaleuca stipitata is lemon scented. It consists mainly of monoterpenoids which in turn contain about 43% the isomers of citral (neral and geranial), and 10% terpinen-4-ol. It is possible that this plant may be suitable for commercial development because of the antimicrobial properties of these compounds.

References

stipitata
Flora of the Northern Territory
Plants described in 1997